Jewish People's Party "Achdus" was a political party in inter-war Lithuania.

History
The party contested the first 1922 parliamentary elections, receiving 2.1% of the vote and winning three seats. However, it received only 53 votes in the 1923 elections and lost its parliamentary representation. It did not contest any further elections.

References

Defunct political parties in Lithuania
Jews and Judaism in Lithuania
Jewish political parties
Political parties of minorities
Political parties with year of establishment missing
Political parties with year of disestablishment missing